Ángel Beltré (born 20 September 1963) is a Dominican Republic boxer. He competed in the men's lightweight event at the 1984 Summer Olympics.

References

1963 births
Living people
Dominican Republic male boxers
Olympic boxers of the Dominican Republic
Boxers at the 1984 Summer Olympics
Boxers at the 1983 Pan American Games
Pan American Games bronze medalists for the Dominican Republic
Pan American Games medalists in boxing
Place of birth missing (living people)
Lightweight boxers
Medalists at the 1983 Pan American Games
20th-century Dominican Republic people
21st-century Dominican Republic people